The Australian Women's Weekly, sometimes known as simply The Weekly, is an Australian monthly women's magazine published by Mercury Capital in Sydney. For many years it was the number one magazine in Australia before being outsold by the Australian edition of Better Homes and Gardens in 2014. , The Weekly has overtaken Better Homes and Gardens again, coming out on top as Australia's most read magazine. The magazine invested in the 2020 film I Am Woman about Helen Reddy, singer, feminist icon and activist. Editor-in-chief Nicole Byers told Film Ink "Helen’s story of adversity and triumph is nothing short of inspirational. The Weekly has been telling stories of iconic Australian women for more than 80 years and we're delighted to be supporting the film production".

History and profile
The magazine was started in 1933 by Frank Packer and Ted Theodore as a weekly publication. The first editor was George Warnecke and the initial dummy was laid out by William Edwin Pidgeon who went on to do many famous covers over the next 25 years. It was to have two distinctive features; firstly, the newspaper's features would have an element of topicality, and secondly the magazine would appeal to all Australian women, regardless of class, and have a national focus. Wanting it to appeal to a mass audience, Warnecke hoped the Weekly would be a sign that Australia finally was coming out of the depression.

By 1961, the publication had a circulation of 800,000.

The Weekly celebrated its 50th anniversary of publication in June 1983 and its 75th anniversary in the October 2008 issue. Publishing and Broadcasting Limited (PBL) launched Women's Weekly versions in Singapore (1997) and Malaysia in 2000. Each Weekly Magazine in the respective Country's publications follow the Australian Weekly version's writing style, whilst publishing local content idiosyncratic of each country.
In 2012 the parent company of the magazine, ACP Magazines, a subsidiary of Nine Entertainment, was acquired by the Bauer Media Group.
Audited circulation under Nene King was 980,000. The 60th anniversary edition sold in excess of one-million. 
Audited circulation in June 2013 was 459,175 copies monthly. Readership numbers for September 2014 were estimated to be 1,828,000.

In mid-June 2020, the Sydney–based investment company Mercury Capital acquired The Australian Women's Weekly as part of its acquisition of Bauer Media's Australian and New Zealand magazine brands. In late September 2020, Mercury Capital rebranded Bauer Media as Are Media, which took over publication of the Woman's Weekly.

Cultural impact 
The overall popularity of the magazine between the 1930s-1980s meant that articles and advertisements published in it were widely read across Australia, not only by women, but men as well. The magazines power to influence and shape culture across the nation intersected with the rise of various women's and parenting issues. In review of issues published between the 1930s-1980s, historians have argued that The Australian Women's Weekly promoted school uniforms for children at a time when school uniforms were not mandatory across the country. This promotion, mainly through targeted coverage of school aged children, shaped views of motherhood and child-rearing throughout Australia. Publications in the magazine focused on products, children's fashion, and celebrity children continue to shape readers views of motherhood and child-rearing.

Format and frequency
The magazine is usually 240 pages long and printed on glossy paper trimmed to A4 page size, although it was originally a Tabloid in size and layout.   It typically contains feature articles about the modern Australian woman. For many years, it included a lift-out TV guide.

In 1982, publication frequency was reduced from weekly to monthly. "Weekly" was retained in the name for reasons of familiarity and because a woman's "monthly" was a slang term for menstruation. The final weekly edition was dated 15 December 1982, followed by the first monthly edition dated January 1983. The TV guide was discontinued on introduction of the monthly format.

Editors
Editors of The Weekly over the years have included George Warnecke (1933–1939), Alice Mabel Jackson (1939–1950), Esmé (Ezzie) Fenston (1950–1972), Dorothy Drain (1972–1975), Ita Buttrose (1975–76), Jennifer Rowe (1987–1992), Nene King, Dawn Swain (1994–2000), Deborah Thomas (1999–2015), Julia Zaetta (2005–06), Robyn Foyster (2007–2009), Helen McCabe (2009–2016), Kim Wilson (2016–17), and Nicole Byers (2017– ).

Helen McCabe, the editor from August 2009 until January 2016, attempted to improve The Weekly news coverage. In late 2009, she hired Juliet Rieden as deputy editor (Rieden was later promoted to Editor) and Jordan Baker, formerly a reporter and travel writer for The Sydney Morning Herald, as news editor. In February 2016 Kim Wilson was named as the editor of the magazine.

In July 2017, Nicole Byers was appointed Editor-in-Chief.

News editors included Les Haylen (from 1933) and Dorothy Drain (from 1958).

Recipes and cookbooks 
The Australian Women's Weekly Test Kitchen (then known as the Leila Howard Test Kitchen) was established just after World War I. From 1965, it continued to be on the same site of the Australian Consolidated Press (ACP) building (corner of Park and Castlereagh Streets) in Sydney. The Test Kitchen's first 'Best Ever' recipes compilation was published in 1976, collating the most-requested recipes from the issues of the Weekly. The cookbook sold out in days and had many reprints.

The Test Kitchen had a team of 16 people in 2006, composed of chefs, home economists, food editors and support staff.

In 2012, ACP was sold to Bauer Media Group. The Test Kitchen triple-tests recipes which are then published in the magazine, as well as Woman's Day and the AWW cookbooks. Surveys have shown that over 90 per cent of readers buy the magazine for the recipes.

See also
 Australian Women's Weekly Children's Birthday Cake Book
 List of women's magazines

References

Further reading
 Rebecca Johinke, Queens of Print: Interviews with Australia’s Iconic Women’s Magazine Editors, Australian Scholarly Publishing, 2019.
 Denis O'Brien, The Weekly: A Lively and Nostalgic Celebration of Australia through 50 Years of its Most Popular Magazine, Ringwood, Victoria: Penguin Books, 1985.

External links

Bauer Media

Pat Buckridge 'Good Reading in The Australian Women's Weekly 1933-1970, JASAL 1 2002
Women's Weekly Singapore Edition Official Website

Jackson, Sally Cost-cutting at mags over: Law The Australian 12 Oct 2009 pp 30, 32 (Retrieved 17 February 2010)
 The Australian Women's Weekly Index on Research Data Australia

1933 establishments in Australia
ACP magazine titles
Are Media
Monthly magazines published in Australia
Weekly magazines published in Australia
Women's magazines published in Australia
Magazines established in 1933
Magazines published in Sydney